The 2010 The Jersey International was a professional tennis tournament played on indoor hard courts. It was part of the 2010 ATP Challenger Tour. It took place in Jersey, Channel Islands between 22 and 28 March 2010.

ATP entrants

Seeds

Rankings are as of March 8, 2010.

Other entrants
The following players received wildcards into the singles main draw:
  Joshua Goodall
  Dominic Inglot
  Daniel Smethurst
  Alexander Ward

The following players received entry from the qualifying draw:
  Laurynas Grigelis
  Joshua Milton
  Frederik Nielsen
  Roman Valent

Champions

Singles

 Jan Hernych def.  Jan Minář, 7–6(3), 6–4

Doubles

 Rohan Bopanna /  Ken Skupski def.  Jonathan Marray /  Jamie Murray, 6–2, 2–6, [10–6]

References
2010 Draws
Lawn Tennis Association (LTA) official website
ITF search 

The Jersey International
Sport in Jersey
International
The Jersey International